El Jardín de Clarilú is an Argentine children's television series, produced by Metrovision Producciones S.A. was broadcast by Disney Junior Latin America on April 1, 2011 and ended on December 12, 2014. The series was the first original production by Disney Junior Latin America.

Plot
The series shows a little girl named Clarilú who solves several mysteries that happen in her garden, along with her best friend Lápiz, a pencil dog.

The series follows a strict formula, where Clarilú receives an anonymous letter at the beginning of the episode, which encourages her to find a lost object and find out who sent the letter.

Argument
On their tour, Clarilú and Lápiz receive help from their friends: an aviator postman and his giant dragonfly, a group of colorful butterflies, a wise spider, pond ducks and a flock of musicians traveling on the shell of a giant, colorful snail.

During this tour, spectators are invited to interact with the story by participating in the search for the mysterious character, encouraging the implantation of the analytical-synthetic thought that is put into practice before any problem solving situation. The keys presented stimulate the learning of letters and words of songs, rhymes and educational games.

The Garden of Clarilu stimulates pre-reading and initial reading skills. The dynamics of the story, the setting and the original characters favor implicit learning, as, while the child's attention is focused on the story, he makes contact and incorporates concepts of reading and writing in a dynamic and fun way.

The Garden of Clarilu encourages small viewers to show their skills in solving logical problems and accompanies them in the initial learning of written reading, adding valuable tools to the future school development of them.

Cast & Characters
 Agustina Cabo as Clarilú
 Thomas Lepera as Pipo
 Leandro Zanardi as A
 Andrés Espinel as B
 Sophie Oliver as C
Voice cast
 Javier Cancino as Lápiz, the Clarilú's dog
 Carmen Sarahí as Loli, the dragonfly
 Carolina Ayala as Irina, the pink butterfly
 Moisés Palacios as Cuac, the duck
 Luis Daniel Ramírez as Duvet, the duck
 Alma Delia Pérez as Griselda, the spider
 Arturo Valdemar as Mariposas arco-iris 1
 Analiz Sánchez as Mariposas arco-iris 2
 Juan Carlos Tinoco as Roco, the giant snail and friend of the ABC band

Soundtrack

The soundtrack was released in Argentina in August 2, 2011, in the form of CD, by Walt Disney Records in Spanish.

The album contains fun and captivating musical themes, presented along the Clarilu (with Agustina Cabo) and the ABC band (with Leandro Zanardi, Andrés Espinel and Sophie Oliver). This Walt Disney Records communications includes 15 unpublished themes that stimulate the imagination and offer fundamental lessons for the small development of small. The songs, while stimulating learning, recreate some of the most significant moments of the series.

Each episode presents musical ratings performed by the ABC band (with Leandro Zanardi, Andrés Espinel and Sophie Oliver), as well as a themed musical cutting closure.
Track listing

El Jardín de Clarilú 2

El Jardín de Clarilú 2 is the second soundtrack of the television series of the same name, was released in November 27, 2012 by Walt Disney Records in Argentina, including the letter game (inside the CD booklet) and dice to cut and play.
Track listing

Awards

References

External links
 
 
 

2011 Argentine television series debuts
2014 Argentine television series endings
2010s mystery television series
Argentine children's television series
Musical television series
Television series about children
Television series by Disney
Disney Junior original programming
2010s preschool education television series